is a Japanese music composer and musician. She is most known for her various contributions to the Bomberman series, amongst other video game soundtracks.

She has studied ney performance and Tunisian style composition under professors Slah Manaa, Ali Sriti and Zakia Hannashi at l'Institut Superieur de la Musique de Tunis, and studied riq under Haytham Farghaly of the same institute. She currently curates arab-music.com, and has also made music for many TV shows, films, and commercials. She is also a part-time lecturer at Kokushikan University, and has since performed many concerts with the classical Arabic music ensemble Le Club Bachraf, with oud player Yoshiko Matsuda and darbuka player Takako Nomiya.

Musical style
Her soundtrack for Bomberman Hero features drum and bass and acid techno styles, heavily incorporating fast breakbeats and sub-bass lines from the former genre.

Works

Video games

Anime
 Bomberman B-Daman Bakugaiden (1998)

Other works
"Samai Bayati Al Aryan" on Music Design (1994) - with Le Club Bachraf
"Ismael Hayat" on Ten Plants (1998)
Musique classique de Tunisie et d'Egypte (2000) - with Le Club Bachraf
Concert at Dar Rachidia (2013) - with Le Club Bachraf
Les Archives (2019)

Notes

References

External links
 Artist profile on arab-music.com
 Bomberman music profile on arab-music.com
 Discography on arab-music.com

Year of birth missing (living people)
Japanese women musicians
Japanese music arrangers
Living people
Musicians from Shimane Prefecture
Musicians from Tokyo
People from Shimane Prefecture
Video game composers
Academic staff of Kokushikan University